Bilje is a settlement east of Miren in the Municipality of Miren-Kostanjevica in the Littoral region of Slovenia. The hill known as Miren Castle rises above the settlement to the south.

The parish church in the settlement is dedicated to Saint Anthony the Hermit and belongs to the Diocese of Capodistria.

Bilje is the birthplace of sculptor Negovan Nemec and philosopher Dean Komel.

References

External links
Bilje on Geopedia
Biglia on Austria-Hungary cadastre
 http://www.meteo.si/uploads/probase/www/climate/table/en/by_location/bilje/climate-normals_81-10_Bilje_eng.pdf

Populated places in the Municipality of Miren-Kostanjevica